Kamenjar is a suburban settlement of the city of Novi Sad, Serbia. It is located between river Danube in the south-west, Adice in the north and Kameničko Ostrvo in the east.

References

Suburbs of Novi Sad